Volt Luxembourg is a political party in Luxembourg. It is an internal section of Volt Europa and was founded in 2018. It received 2.11% of the vote in the 2019 European elections, which meant that the party did not win a mandate.

History 
The party was officially founded on 10 November 2018, as part of the pan-European movement Volt Europa. The aim of the party and movement is to reform Europe, make it more democratic and strengthen the European Parliament, to which end it established offshoots across Europe.

European Election 2019 
The party's list of candidates for the European elections was officially presented on 20 March 2019. Thanks in part to a signature by DP member of parliament Max Hahn, in Luxembourg candidate lists require 250 signatures of support from voters or a people's representative, the list could be officially submitted and the party could stand for election. With roots in Luxembourg, Italy, Spain, France, America, Portugal and Great Britain, the list of candidates was very international in character. In addition to the candidates Marthe Hoffmann, Daniel Silva and Julia Pitterman, the former rector of the University of Luxembourg, Rolf Tarrach, stood as the top candidate, the chair of the group of British immigrants living in Luxembourg (Brill) and co-chair of British in Europe, Fiona Godfrey, and Christopher Lilyblad, Betzdorf local councillor, former CSV member and project manager at the EU Commission, stood for the party.

In the run-up to the election, RTL initially refused to broadcast an election advertisement for the party because it was in French instead of Luxembourgish. After an intervention by the independent broadcasting authority (Alia), the station broadcast the election spot after all.

Prior to the election, candidates from the party joined other candidates in signing a pledge to use their parliamentary position to strengthen LGBTQ protections in EU law and policy, create an environment for LGBTI human rights defenders, be an ally for underrepresented voices and ensure EU leadership on LGBTI rights. The party stressed that the EU must face and better address global issues such as affordable housing, poverty, gender inequality, homophobia, youth unemployment, the climate crisis and corruption. For Volt, the European Union is too focused on technocratic projects and needs to put citizens back at the centre of the project.

In the European elections, the party obtained just under 26,500 votes (2.11%), thus failing to win a mandate in Luxembourg, but achieving Volt's best relative result. However, with the German MEP Damian Boeselager, the party has a representative in the European Parliament as part of the European movement, as Boeselager confirmed after the election.

After the European Election 
After the election, the party announced that it would contest upcoming parliamentary and European elections. In July 2020, the party criticised the uncoordinated approach during the Corona crisis and national go-it-alones instead of pooling resources in Europe to deal with the pandemic. They called for more joint action in Europe to deal with crises faster and better. The party also referred to other major challenges such as the refugee crisis and the climate crisis, which could not be successfully met with national solo efforts.

Election results

External links 

 Website Volt Luxembourg

References 

Luxembourg
Political parties in Luxembourg
2018 establishments in Luxembourg
Political parties established in 2018